Volley De Haan is a women's volleyball team based in De Haan, Belgium. The club was founded in 1968.

The women's A squad currently plays in Ere Divisie, the highest level of the Belgian volleyball league pyramid. In the 2008–09 season, they achieved promotion to this level for the first time in their history, when they defeated penultimate placed Ere Divisie side VC Mosan Yvoir after playoffs. De Haan, champions of 2008–09 champions of First National League B, had missed the opportunity to promote directly after losing the playoffs against DV Hasselt, champions of 1st National League A.

Volley De Haan managed to stay in Ere divisie in the 2010 - 2011 season, thanks to a series of victories in the second round. (za. 22.01 VBC Zandhoven  - Volley De Haan A 2-3, za. 29.01 Volley De Haan A  - DV Hasselt 3-2, zo. 30.01 Volley De Haan A  - Datovoc Tongeren 3-1).

ERE AFDELING DAMES 2010 - 2011	 	 	 	 	 	 	 	
1.Asterix Kieldrecht	        63
2.VDK Gent Dames		56
3.Dauphines Charleroi	        50
4. Hermes Volley Oostende	46
5.Richa Michelbeke              35
6.Datovoc Tongeren	        31
7.Gea Happel Amigos Zoersel	30
8.VC Oudegem		        29
9.VBC Zandhoven	                20
10.Volley De Haan		14
11.DV Hasselt	                14
12.VBK Smash Oud-Turnhout	8

Volley De Haan also has a B and C squad playing in the lower provincial leagues.

The club hosts a friendly international volleyball tournament each season.

Current squad 2011 - 2012
Coach:  ????
Ass. Coach:  Wim Ogiers
Scouting:  Luc Vermeersch

External links
Official site 

Belgian volleyball clubs
Sport in West Flanders
De Haan, Belgium